The Tule Mountains is a mountain range in Yuma County, Arizona. There is a diverse flora and fauna population within the Tule Mountains; one of the notable trees found in this mountain range is the elephant tree (Bursera microphylla).

See also 
 Gila Mountains

References 

 Will Croft Barnes and Byrd H. Granger. 1960. Arizona place names, p. 511
 C. Michael Hogan. 2009. Elephant Tree: Bursera microphylla, GlobalTwitcher.com, ed. N. Stromberg

Notes 

Mountain ranges of Arizona
Mountain ranges of Yuma County, Arizona